Metro Jets is a song written by Nick Gilder and James McCulloch, and recorded by Nick Gilder in 1979.

Magnus Uggla version

Magnus Uggla recorded the song, with lyrics by himself in Swedish, as "Centrumhets" on his 1980 album Den ljusnande framtid är vår.

References

Magnus Uggla songs
1979 songs
Songs written by Nick Gilder